is a Japanese TV and film actress and a former adult video (AV) star. Early in her career as a model, she also used the names Yukiko Hara and Rika Inoue.

Life and career

Gravure model
Maria Takagi was born in Chiba Prefecture, Japan on October 25, 1978. Using the name Yukiko Hara, she released a "gravure" (non-nude) photo album Nishi-Shinjuku Love Story in June 1998. She made an early movie appearance in the August 1998 mainstream film , a love story directed by pink film director Shuji Kataoka. In November 1998, under the name Rika Inoue, she posed for the men's magazine Urecco and as Maria Takagi, issued a photobook of nude pictures titled Blue in December 2000. The next year, Takagi starred in the erotic fantasy  written and directed by Kei Marimura which reached theaters in July 2001. Takagi also had a small part in the Kyoto Broadcasting System TV show  directed by Naoyuki Tomomatsu and broadcast on January 5, 2002. Later in 2002, she had a role in the erotic drama  which premiered in Ikebukuro in September 2002.

AV début
Takagi made her début as an adult video actress with the December 2002 release Super-Star for the Max-A Calen label. At the time of her début, AllAbout columnist Hiroshi Asuka commented on her reputation as an actress and her star quality. Six months later, the same writer described her as one of the top actresses in the adult field. It was announced in October 2003 that Takagi would play the "other woman" of a married man in the Fuji TV drama series  but that she would be continuing in her AV career. The Japanese newspaper Mainichi Shimbun reported in 2003 that she was the highest paid AV actress in Japan.

In late 2003 Takagi was the winner of five awards at the Kuki Inc.-owned XCity's Adult Video Grand Prix Awards. The biggest adult site in Japan at that time, XCity conferred upon Takagi both the Best New Actress and Best Actress awards, and the Best Video Title, Best Conversation, and Prettiest Face awards of 2003. In December 2003, Takagi celebrated her first anniversary with the Max-A studio with the video Maria Perfect One Year!!. Her last adult video, Fin...Maria Takagi, was released in February 2004 completing the 15 videos that she had originally contracted for with Max-A.

Television and movies
Takagi's first feature film after her retirement from adult videos was the romantic horror comedy  with Saori Takizawa which was first shown in Tokyo theaters in December 2004. The next year, in addition to guest appearances on various TV shows, Takagi appeared in two horror films, the mock documentary Noroi where she played herself and the manga-based Tokyo Zombie directed by Sakichi Sato.

Takagi was a regular on the Tokai TV drama , as the "femme fatale" Keiko Tokumaru, during its July to September 2005 run, and also on the Fuji TV hospital series  playing the part of Nurse Nishi Tomoko from January to March 2006. In September 2007, she played Kasumi in the TV Asahi drama , a TV special movie based on the Kuroi taiyō TV series.

Beginning with the fourth installment in July 2007, Takagi has been cast as hotel employee Kozue Morita on the two-hour TV Asahi mystery movies . The series, part of the TV Asahi , aired its 12th episode in January 2013. Takagi had a major role in the 2015 film Shinda Me o Shita Shonen, a youth drama based on the manga of the same name by Tomohiro Koizumi.

Select filmography
 Noroi (August 2005)
 Tokyo Zombie (December 2005)

Notes

External links
 
 
 
 

1978 births
Japanese pornographic film actresses
Living people
Artists from Chiba Prefecture